John Leask Lumley (4 November 1930 in Detroit, Michigan – 30 May 2015 in Ithaca, New York) was an American fluid dynamicist and a professor at Cornell University. He is widely known for his research in turbulence and is the coauthor of A First Course in Turbulence along with Hendrik Tennekes.

Academic career
Lumley received his M.S.E. and Ph.D. degrees from Johns Hopkins University in 1954 and 1957 respectively. His Ph.D. thesis supervisor was Stanley Corrsin. He started his academic career at the Pennsylvania State University where he became Evan Pugh Professor of Aerospace Engineering. He was also in charge of research on turbulence and transition at the Applied Research Laboratory. In 1977 Lumley joined Cornell University where he was the Willis H. Carrier Professor of Mechanical and Aerospace Engineering (Emeritus) until his death in May 2015 of brain cancer.
He was an editor of the Annual Review of Fluid Mechanics from 1977 to 2002.

Honors and awards
Lumley received the 1990 Fluid Dynamics Prize of American Physical Society, "For his outstanding contributions to the understanding of turbulent flow, in particular, the fundamental structure of turbulent shear flows, the effects of drag-reducing additives, and his widely recognized contributions to the statistical theory of turbulence, and for his personal and intellectual leadership in the international fluid dynamics community, including his educational films and books, and his long active devotion to the Division of Fluid Dynamics of The American Physical Society." He has also received several other awards, including:
Fluid and Plasma Dynamics Award of the American Institute of Aeronautics and Astronautics, 1982
Timoshenko Medal, 1993
Recipient of two honorary doctorate degrees (honoris causa) from the French University System, in Lyon and in Poitiers.
Fellow of the American Institute of Aeronautics and Astronautics
Fellow of the American Academy of Arts and Sciences
Member of the National Academy of Engineering

Books authored
 Tennekes, H. and J. L. Lumley, A First Course in Turbulence, MIT Press, Cambridge, MA (1972). 
 Holmes, P., J. L. Lumley, and G. Berkooz, Turbulence, Coherent Structures, Dynamical Systems and Symmetry, Cambridge University Press (1998). 
 Lumley, J. L., Engines: An Introduction, Cambridge University Press, (1999). hbk ; pbk 
 Lumley, J. L., Still Life with Cars: An Automotive Memoir, McFarland, (2005). 
 Lumley, J. L., Stochastic Tools in Turbulence, Dover Publications (2007). 
 Monin, A. S., A. M. Yaglom, and J. L. Lumley, Statistical Fluid Mechanics - vol 1: Mechanics of Turbulence, The MIT Press (1971). 
 Lumley, J. L., H. A. Panofsky, "The Structure of Atmospheric Turbulence", John Wiley & Sons, Inc, New York, NY (1964).

References

1930 births
2015 deaths
Fluid dynamicists
Johns Hopkins University alumni
Pennsylvania State University faculty
Cornell University faculty
Fellows of the American Academy of Arts and Sciences
Members of the United States National Academy of Engineering
Fellows of the American Institute of Aeronautics and Astronautics
Annual Reviews (publisher) editors